Barbara Schett and Patty Schnyder were the defending champions but did not compete that year.

Iveta Benešová and Květa Peschke won in the final 6–2, 2–6, 6–2 against Anabel Medina Garrigues and Dinara Safina.

Seeds
Champion seeds are indicated in bold text while text in italics indicates the round in which those seeds were eliminated.

 Anabel Medina Garrigues /  Dinara Safina (final)
 Silvia Farina Elia /  Marta Marrero (quarterfinals)
 Tathiana Garbin /  Tina Križan (semifinals)
 Jelena Kostanić /  Claudine Schaul (quarterfinals)

Draw

External links
2005 Open Gaz de France Doubles Draw

Doubles
Open Gaz de France